National Secondary Route 209, or just Route 209 (or ) is a National Road Route of Costa Rica, located in the San José province.

Description
In San José province the route covers San José canton (Catedral, San Francisco de Dos Ríos, San Sebastián districts), Desamparados canton (Desamparados, San Rafael Arriba districts), Aserrí canton (Aserrí, Tarbaca, Vuelta de Jorco, San Gabriel, Salitrillos districts), Mora canton (Guayabo, Tabarcia, Jaris districts), Acosta canton (San Ignacio, Palmichal districts).

References

Highways in Costa Rica